Kolathupalayam is a panchayat town in Dharapuram taluk of Tirupur District in the Indian state of Tamil Nadu. Kolathupalayam Located 5km From Dharapuram.

Geography

Demographics
 India census, Kolathupalayam had a population of 17,321. Males constitute 55% of the population and females 45%. Kolathupalayam has an average literacy rate of 75.05%, higher than the national average literacy rates (73.8%) (age 7 and above) in 2011 were 82.14% for men and 65.46% for women.

Administration and politics
KoluthuPalayam is part of Dharapuram taluk in Tiruppur district of Tamil Nadu. It belongs to Dharapuram State Assembly Constituency(SC) and Erode Lok Sabha constituency.

AIADMK, DMK,Indian National Congress (INC) BJP, Tamil Nadu Kongu Ilaingar Peravai and other Kongu parties are the major political parties in this area.

Economy 
Agriculture, Big Paddy Seeds farms are main source of Economy.
Commercial Banks and Agriculture Co-Operative banks operate in the village.

Education
The Village houses a Government high school at Kolathupalayam. Private schools include Sakthi Nursery And Primary School, Kolathupalayam.

References

Cities and towns in Tiruppur district